Team Hoyt refers to father Dick Hoyt (June 1, 1940 – March 17, 2021) and his son Rick Hoyt (born January 10, 1962) from Holland, Massachusetts. The Hoyts competed together in various athletic endeavors, including marathons and Ironman Triathlons. Rick has cerebral palsy. During competition, Dick pulled Rick in a special boat as they would swim, carried him in a special seat in the front of a bicycle, and pushed him in a special wheelchair as they ran. Team Hoyt were inducted to the Ironman Hall of Fame and were recipients of ESPN's Jimmy V Award.

Rick Hoyt's birth and early life
Rick Hoyt was diagnosed with cerebral palsy at birth after his umbilical cord became twisted around his neck, which caused the blockage of oxygen flow. As a result, his brain could not properly control his muscles.  
Many doctors encouraged the Hoyts to institutionalize Rick, informing them that he would be nothing more than a "vegetable." His parents held on to the fact that Rick's eyes would follow them around the room, giving them hope that he would somehow be able to communicate someday.  The Hoyts took Rick every week to Children's Hospital in Boston, where they met a doctor who encouraged the Hoyts to treat Rick like any other child. Rick's mother Judy spent hours each day teaching Rick the alphabet with sandpaper letters and posting signs on every object in the house. In a short amount of time, Rick learned the alphabet.

At the age of 11, after some persistence from his parents, Rick was fitted with a computer that enabled him to communicate, and it became clear that Rick was intelligent. With this communication device, Rick was also able to attend public schools for the first time.

Rick went on to graduate from Boston University in 1993 with a degree in special education. He later worked at Boston College in a computer lab helping to develop systems to aid in communication and other tasks for people with disabilities.

Team history

Team Hoyt began in 1977 when Rick asked his father if they could run in a race together to benefit a lacrosse player at his school who had become paralyzed. He wanted to prove that life went on no matter your disability. Dick Hoyt, a retired Lieutenant Colonel in the Air National Guard, was not a runner and was 36 years old. After their first race Rick said, "Dad, when I’m running, it feels like I’m not handicapped." After their initial five mile run, Dick began running every day with a bag of cement in the wheelchair because Rick was at school and studying, unable to train with him.

Through March 2016, the Hoyts had competed in 1,130 endurance events, including 72 marathons and six Ironman Triathlons. They had run the Boston Marathon 32 times. Also adding to their list of achievements, Dick and Rick biked and ran across the U.S. in 1992, completing a full  in 45 days.
They also competed in triathlons. For the swim portion of a triathlon, Dick used a rope attached to his body to pull Rick sitting in a boat. For the cycle portion, Rick rode on the front of a specially designed tandem bike. For the run portion, Dick pushed Rick in his wheelchair.

In the 2013 Boston Marathon, Team Hoyt had about a mile to go when two bombs exploded near the finish line; they were stopped by officials, along with thousands of other runners still running the race. They were not injured. A bystander with an SUV gave them a ride to the Sheraton hotel, and they were temporarily separated from Rick's wheelchair.

On April 21, 2014, Dick and Rick Hoyt completed the 2014 Boston Marathon, having previously announced that it would be their last together. From 2015 through 2019, Rick Hoyt was pushed in the Boston Marathon by Bryan Lyons, a dentist from Billerica, Massachusetts; Lyons died in June 2020, aged 50.

Dick Hoyt died in his sleep at his home in Holland, Massachusetts, on March 17, 2021, after experiencing some health problems. He was 80 years old.

Honors 

Team Hoyt was inducted to the Ironman Hall of Fame in 2008.

On April 8, 2013, a bronze statue in honor of the Hoyts was dedicated near the start of the Boston Marathon in Hopkinton, Massachusetts.

ESPN honored Team Hoyt with the Jimmy V Perseverance Award at the ESPY Award show on July 17, 2013.

Team Hoyt was also featured on inspirational billboards within the U.S.

Racing history 

Total events:  1,130

References

Further reading
Team Hoyt Success Story TheFinalSprint.com, July 2007
The Wheels Of Life Sports Illustrated, April 18, 2011
Dick and Rick Hoyt: Still Running Together impowerage.com, January 25, 2012, via Wayback Machine
A Father’s Special Dedication: The Racing World of Dick and Rick Hoyt howtheyplay.com, April 1, 2020

External links
 
 Photo Gallery: Team Hoyt at sportsillustrated.cnn.com via Wayback Machine
La Marató de TV3 (in Catalan) via YouTube

American disabled sportspeople
American male triathletes
Boston Marathon
People from Holland, Massachusetts
Sportspeople from Hampden County, Massachusetts